John Corbett (born September 23, 1962) is an American politician who has served in the Georgia House of Representatives from the 174th district since 2015.

References

1962 births
Living people
21st-century American politicians
Republican Party members of the Georgia House of Representatives